Deuteronoda is a genus of leaf beetles in the subfamily Eumolpinae. They are known from Central America and South America.

Species
 Deuteronoda brunneovittata Bechyné, 1958
 Deuteronoda clavipes (Bechyné, 1950)
 Deuteronoda clavipes brasiliensis Bechyné, 1954
 Deuteronoda clavipes clavipes (Bechyné, 1950)
 Deuteronoda clavipes metallescens Bechyné, 1951
 Deuteronoda foveolata (Lefèvre, 1884)
 Deuteronoda physipyga Bechyné, 1953
 Deuteronoda racenisi Bechyné, 1958
 Deuteronoda suturalis (Lefèvre, 1878)
 Deuteronoda suturalis borbensis Bechyné, 1951
 Deuteronoda suturalis carmellita Bechyné, 1951
 Deuteronoda suturalis suturalis (Lefèvre, 1878)

References

Eumolpinae
Chrysomelidae genera
Beetles of Central America
Beetles of South America